Urodacus butleri is a species of scorpion in the Urodacidae family. It is endemic to Australia, and was first described in 2012.

Etymology
The specific epithet butleri honours Australian naturalist, conservation consultant and television presenter Harry Butler.

Description
The species grows to about 50–70 mm in length. Colouration is mainly dark brown.

Distribution and habitat
The species has been recorded from Barrow Island and the adjacent Pilbara region of Western Australia on consolidated sandy substrates.

References

 

 
butleri
Scorpions of Australia
Endemic fauna of Australia
Fauna of Western Australia
Animals described in 2012